Heinz Wiendl (born 1968 in Rötz) is a German neurologist and professor at the University Hospital Muenster. He is known for his works in the field of nervous system inflammation and multiple sclerosis.

Biography 
Wiendl studied psychology and medicine from 1989 to 1996 at the University of Erlangen-Nuremberg, Germany, Duke University, North Carolina, and Bale University, Switzerland. He obtained his MD in 1996. In the following years, he was a scholar of the German Research Council (Deutsche Forschungsgemeinschaft) at the Max Planck Institute of Neurobiology (Martinsried), worked as a clinical and research fellow at the Department of Neurology Tuebingen, received board certification (2004) and completed his habilitation (2004). In 2005 he was appointed as a professor of neurology and head of the clinical research group for MS and neuroimmunology in Wuerzburg and acted as a vice-chair of the Department of Neurology. In 2010 he was recruited to the University of Muenster, where he accepted the position as a director of the Department of Neurology – Inflammatory Diseases of the Nervous System and Neurooncology. Since 1 May 2013 he is director of the Department of Neurology in Muenster.

Scientific contribution 
Wiendl’s clinical and scientific work focusses on inflammatory diseases of the nervous system. Taking multiple sclerosis as an exemplary disease, he primarily investigates aspects of immunoregulation and the interaction between immune system and nervous system. Furthermore, Wiendl conducted research projects on immune cell trafficking and explores biomarkers for the prognosis and therapy of multiple sclerosis. By establishing translational research projects, his work helps to further elucidate the question of how immune therapies in neurological diseases work and how new mechanisms of action can be developed. In his research projects, Wiendl pursues a translational approach, closely connecting laboratory work with patient care. With this objective, he also established a biobank at the Department of Neurology Muenster. Wiendl was involved in the development of the monoclonal antibody daclizumab which was approved in 2016 and exhibits a completely new mechanism of action in MS therapy, and Ofatumumab. Heinz Wiendl helped to establish the multiple sclerosis network KKNMS (Krankheitsbezogenes Kompetenznetzwerk Multiple Sklerose). He is co-speaker of the transregional collaborative research center 128 ("Multiple Sclerosis") of the DFG and acts as a member of the steering committee of the excellence cluster "Cells in Motion" (CiM), funded by the German federal government. In 2019, Wiendl was one of the main initiators of the successful application for funds from the German government to build the "Body and Brain Institute" and since has been acting as speaker of the project.

Academic memberships
Wiendl is a member in the following academic societies: German Society for Immunology (DGfI), German Society of Multiple Sclerosis (DMSG), German Society for Muscular Disease (DGM), German Society of Neurology (DGN),  American Academy of Neurology (AAN), International Society of Neuroimmunology (ISNI), Editorial Board of the Public Library of Science (PLoS) ONE.

Honors and awards
 2017 Honorary professor at Sydney medical school
2015 Sobek award for MS research of the German Society of Multiple Sclerosis (DMSG)
Heinrich-Pette award of the German Society for Neurology (DGN)
 2004 Sobek award for MS research (young scientists’ award) of the German Society of Multiple Sclerosis (DMSG)
2003 Felix-Jerusalem award of the German Society for Muscular Disease (DGM)

Third-party funding 
Wiendl receives funds from the European Union, the federal ministry for education and research (BMBF) for Germany and Nordrhein-Westfalen, the Deutsche Forschungsgesellschaft (DFG), the program for innovative medical research (IMF) of the medical faculty Muenster, the interdisciplinary center for clinical research (IZKF) Muenster, the Else-Kroener-Fresenius-Stiftung and the RE Children’s Foundation.

Publications 
Wiendl published more than 500 scientific works and reviews, books, book chapters and monographies (as of November 2020). Selected publications:

 Gerdes LA, Janoschka C, Eveslage M, Mannig B, Wirth T, Schulte-Mecklenbeck A, Lauks S, Glau L, Gross CC, Tolosa E, Flierl-Hecht A, Ertl-Wagner B, Barkhof F, Meuth SG, Kümpfel T, Wiendl H, Hohlfeld R, Klotz L. Immune signatures of prodromal multiple sclerosis in monozygotic twins. Proc Natl Acad Sci U S A. 117(35):21546-21556.
 Hauser SL, Bar-Or A, Cohen JA, Comi G, Correale J, Coyle PK, Cross AH, de Seze J, Leppert D, Montalban X, Selmaj K, Wiendl H, Kerloeguen C, Willi R, Li B, Kakarieka A, Tomic D, Goodyear A, Pingili R, Häring DA, Ramanathan K, Merschhemke M, Kappos L; ASCLEPIOS I and ASCLEPIOS II Trial Groups. Ofatumumab versus Teriflunomide in Multiple Sclerosis. N Engl J Med 6;383(6):546-557.
 Klotz L*, Eschborn M*, Lindner M*, Liebmann M, Herold M, Janoschka C, Torres Garrido B, Schulte-Mecklenbeck A, Gross CC, Breuer J, Hundehege P, Posevitz V, Pignolet B, Nebel G, Glander S, Freise N, Austermann J, Wirth T, Campbell GR, Schneider-Hohendorf T, Eveslage M, Brassat D, Schwab N, Loser K, Roth J, Busch KB, Stoll M, Mahad DJ, Meuth SG, Turner T, Bar-Or A, Wiendl H (2019) Teriflunomide treatment for multiple sclerosis modulates T cell mitochondrial respiration with affinity-dependent effects. Sci Transl Med 11 (490):eaao5563. *equal contribution
 Gross CC*, Meyer C*, Bhatia U*, Yshii L*, Kleffner I*, Bauer J*, Tröscher A, Schulte-Mecklenbeck A, Herich S, Schneider-Hohendorf T, Plate H, Kuhlmann T, Schwaninger M, Brück W, Pawlitzki M, Laplaud D-A, Loussouarn D, Parratt J, Barnett M, Buckland ME, Hardy TA, Reddel SW, Ringelstein M, Dörr J, Wildemann B, Kraemer M, Lassmann H, Höftberger R, Beltrán E, Dornmair K, Schwab N, Klotz L, Meuth SG*, Martin-Blondel G*, Wiendl H*, Liblau R*. (2019). CD8+ T cell-mediated endotheliopathy is a targetable mechanism of neuroinflammation in Susac syndrome. Nat Comm 10:5779. * equal contribution, *shared last authorship, equal correspondence
 Schneider-Hohendorf T, Görlich D, Savola P, Kelkka T, Mustjoki S, Gross CC, Owens GC, Klotz L, Dornmair K, Wiendl H, Schwab N (2018) Sex bias in MHC I-associated shaping of the adaptive immune system. Proc Natl Acad Sci U S A 115(9):2168-2173.
 Gerwien H*, Hermann S, Zhang X, Korpos E, Song J, Kopka K, Faust A, Wenning C, Gross CC, Honold L, Melzer M, Opdenakker G, Wiendl H, Schäfers M*, Sorokin L*(2016) Imaging Matrix Metalloproteinase Activity in     Multiple Sclerosis as a Specific Marker of Leukocyte Penetration of the     Blood-Brain Barrier. Sci Transl Med 8(364):364ra152. (*equal contribution)
 Klotz L, Kuzmanov I, Hucke S, Gross CC, Posevitz V, Dreykluft A, Schulte-Mecklenbeck A, Janoschka C, Lindner M, Herold M, Schwab N, Ludwig-Portugall I, Kurts C, Meuth SG, Kuhlmann T, Wiendl H (2016) B7-H1 shapes     T-cell-mediated brain endothelial cell dysfunction and regional encephalitogenicity in spontaneous CNS autoimmunity. Proc Natl Acad Sci U S A 113(41):E6182-E6191.
 Gross CC, Schulte-Mecklenbeck A, Rünzi A, Kuhlmann T, Posevitz-Fejfár A, Schwab N, Schneider-Hohendorf T, Herich S, Held K, Konjević M, Hartwig M, Dornmair K, Hohlfeld R, Ziemssen T, Klotz L, Meuth SG, Wiendl H (2016) Impaired NK-mediated regulation of T-cell activity in multiple sclerosis is reconstituted by IL-2 receptor modulation. Proc Natl Acad Sci U S A 113(21):E2973-2982.
 Kappos L, Wiendl H, Selmaj K, Arnold DL, Havrdova E, Boyko A, Kaufman M, Rose J, Greenberg S, Sweetser M, Riester K, O'Neill G, Elkins J (2015) Daclizumab HYP versus Interferon Beta-1a in Relapsing Multiple Sclerosis. N Engl J Med 373(15):1418-1428.
 Schneider-Hohendorf T, Rossaint J, Mohan H, Böning D, Breuer J, Kuhlmann T, Gross CC, Flanagan K, Sorokin L, Vestweber D, Zarbock A, Schwab N, Wiendl H (2014) VLA-4 blockade promotes differential routes into human CNS involving PSGL-1 rolling of T cells and MCAM-adhesion of T(H)17 cells. J Exp Med 211(9):1833-1846.
 Breuer J, Schwab N, Schneider-Hohendorf T, Marziniak M, Mohan H, Bhatia U, Gross CC, Clausen BE, Weishaupt C, Luger TA, Meuth SG, Loser K, Wiendl H (2014) Ultraviolet B light attenuates the systemic immune response in central nervous system autoimmunity. Ann Neurol 75(5):739-758.
 Bittner S*, Ruck T*, Schuhmann MK, Herrmann AM, Maati HMO, Bobak N, Göbel K, Langhauser F, Stegner D, Ehling P, Borsotto M, Pape H, Nieswandt B, Kleinschnitz C, Heurteaux C, Galla H, Budde T, Wiendl H*, Meuth SG* (2013) Endothelial TWIK-related potassium channel-1 (TREK 1) regulates immune-cell trafficking into the CNS. Nat Med 19:1161-1165. * equal contribution
 H. Wiendl Publication list ResearchGate
 H. Wiendl Publication list PubMed

References

External links 
 University Clinic of Muenster: Neurology
 Multiple Sclerosis SFB/CRT-TR 128

1968 births
German neurologists
German medical researchers
Living people